In Māori mythology the Nuku-mai-tore are forest-dwelling spirits. Tura joins Whiro's canoe party, but when it enters a whirlpool he catches the overhanging boughs of a tree and lives among the Nuku-mai-tore, to whom he teaches the use of fire, the art of cooking, and the natural way of childbirth together with the ceremonies attending to the birth of a child.

See also
Patupaiarehe
Menehune
Taotao Mona
Anito

Notes

References
M. Beckwith, Hawaiian Mythology (University of Hawaii Press: Honolulu) 1970.
J. White, The Ancient History of the Maori, 6 Volumes (Government Printer: Wellington), 1887–1891.

Māori legendary creatures
Forest spirits
Austronesian spirituality